Nicholas Street is an arterial road in the central area of Ottawa, Ontario which connects Highway 417 with the downtown core. Despite being a municipal road, the street is designated as part of Canada's National Highway System, as part of an interconnecting route between Highway 417 and Quebec Autoroute 5 in Gatineau.

The southern section of the road is a freeway between the Queensway (Highway 417) interchange and Laurier Avenue intersection. Between Laurier and Daly Avenue, Nicholas is a one-way southbound road, while traffic northbound from Laurier is diverted to Waller Street. Rideau Street is the northern terminus of Nicholas Street.

Landmarks along this road include the Rideau Centre shopping centre and the University of Ottawa.

The Rideau Canal parallels Nicholas Street to the west. Colonel By Drive is situated between the Canal and Nicholas. The OC Transpo bus Transitway is a parallel facility situated to the east for much of Nicholas Street's length.

It is named for Nicholas Sparks, a prominent early citizen of Ottawa.

Major intersections from north to south 
 Rideau Street
 Besserer Street
 Daly Avenue
 Waller Street, access to Mackenzie King Bridge
 Laurier Avenue
 Queensway (Highway 417)

References

 
 Google Maps: Nicholas Street route

Roads in Ottawa